Raat Hone Ko Hai is an Indian television horror series that premiered on Sahara Manoranjan on 10 May 2004.

Cast

Story# 1: House No. 44
 Nivedita Bhattacharya as Ruma (Episode 1 - Episode 4)
 Rajat Kapoor as Anand (Episode 1 - Episode 4)
 Manish Khanna as Dr. Chakramand (Episode 2 & Episode 3)

Story # 2 : Paying Guest
 Hiten Paintal
 Deepa Parab
 Usha Bachani
 Vijay Aidasani
 Shabnam Sayed

Story # 3: Marriage
 Hrishikesh Pandey
 Ritu Chaudhary
 Manini Mishra
 Vishal Watwani
 Naresh Suri

Story # 4: Adhikar 
 Akshay Anand as Anil (Episode 13 - Episode 16)
 Mona Ambegaonkar as Malti (Episode 13 - Episode 16)
 Amar Talwar as Anil's Father (Episode 13)
 Aditya Kapadia as Teenager Anuj (Episode 14 & Episode 15)
 Ahmed Khan as Advocate (Episode 15 & Episode 16)
 Romit Raj as Anuj (Episode 15 & Episode 16)

Story # 5: Khandar
 Riva Bubber as Urshila (Episode 17 - Episode 20)
 Deepak Dutta as Mukul (Episode 17 - Episode 20)
 Nigaar Khan as Mona (Episode 17 - Episode 20)
 Ravi Khanvilkar as Evil Spirit (Episode 17 - Episode 20)

Story # 6: Prakop
 Sandeep Rajora as Inspector Solan (Episode 21 - Episode 24)
 Siddharth Choudhary
 Munisha Khatwani

Story # 7: Ateet
 Sumeera Banerjee
 Alyy Khan
 Indu Verma
 Sanjeev Seth

Story # 8: Dark Water
 Rakshanda Khan as Mansi (Episode 29 - Episode 32)
 Mukesh Ahuja as Estate Agent (Episode 29)
 Yash Mittal as Sunny (Episode 29 - Episode 32)
 Poornima Joshi as Himakshi (Episode 30 - Episode 32)
 Jayant Rawal as Sonal's Uncle (Episode 32)
 Arup Pal as Nikhil (Episode 32)

Story # 9: Contest # 86
 Faraaz Khan as Harry (Episode 33 - Episode 36)
  Ahmed Khan as Anna (Episode 33 - Episode 36)
 Mazher Sayed as Santosh (Episode 33 - Episode 34 & Episode 36)
 Nagesh Bhonsle as Vijay (Episode 33 - Episode 36)
 Pavan Malhotra as Mahesh (Episode 33 - Episode 36)
 Raymon Singh as Renu (Episode 33 - Episode 34 & Episode 36)
 Prakash Ramchandani as Atul (Episode 34 & Episode 36)

Story # 10: Theatre
 Yashpal Sharma as Rakesh
 Purbi Joshi as Shreya
 Narendra Jha as Balwidar
 Surekha Sikri
 Kavita Kaushik
 Abhay Bhargava
 Yajuvendra Singh
 Mahendra Mewati
 Denzil Smith
 Dadhi Raj Pandey
 Smita Bhattacharya
 Dhamendra Rana
 Milind Gawali
 Mayur Khan
 Manish Mathur
 Snigdha Akolkar

Story # 11: Poem
 Manek Bedi
 Benika Bisht
 Daya Shankar Pandey
 Bobby Vasta
 Santosh Shah
 Pawan Chopra
 Mubassar Ali
 Saba Mirza

Story # 12: Gumnaam
 Mayuri Kango
 Rajesh Khera
 Prithvi Zutshi
 Prashant Bhatt
 Saurabh Dubey
 Jyoti Joshi
 Sahil Singh
 Sunila Karambelkar

Story # 13: Life Line
 Avinash Wadhawan
 Aditya Srivastava as Pramod (Episode 49 - Episode 52)
 Prateeksha Lonkar
 Kunal Tavri
 Pankaj Karla
 Neha Bam
 Dhananjay Singh
 Himali
 Saheba
 Raj Arjun
 Ananya Chatterjee
 Sachal Tyagi

Story # 14: Drishti
 Shri Vallabh Vyas
 Smita Bansal as Priyanka (Episode 53 - Episode 56)
 Vishal Singh
 Dimple Inamdar
 Ekta Sharma
 Menaka Lalwani
 Ajay Trehan
 Afzaal Khan
 Rambahadur Renu
 Ramesh Goyal
 Tabrez Khan

Story # 15: Bargad
 Bijoy Anand
 Sonali Khare
 Keerti Gaekwad Kelkar as Naina (Episode 57 - Episode 60)
 Manish Khanna
 Ali Khan
 Kuldip Sharma
 Harsh Somaya
 Deepa Chaphekar
 Shahid Khan
 Rajesh Dubey
 Samar Jai Singh
 Priyanka Srivastava

Story # 16: Hotel Maya
 Anup Soni
 Sheetal Shah
 Amrapali Gupta
 Madhavi Chopra
 Rajeeta Kochar
 Divya Sharma
 Rajesh Vashisht
 Pravin Brahmabhatt

Story # 17: Maut
 Nawab Shah
 Sonal Pendse
 Shivani Gosain
 Sanjeev Mehra
 Nimai Bali
 Anand Mishra
 Kishan Savjan
 Shanti Bhushan
 Manoj Kainthola
 Kamlesh Trivedi

Story # 18: Connection
 Gufi Paintal
 Neha Mehta
 Rushad Rana
 Poorva Parag
 Naveen Bawa
 Deepraj Rana
 Bhavan Sharma
 Sachal Tyagi
 Ajay Verma
 Raja Kapse
 Mehboob Khan
 Jaydutt Vyas
 Gurinder Makhna

Story # 19: Ichchha
 Lilliput
 Joy Sengupta
 Vipra Rawal
 Bakul Thakkar
 Ashwin Kaushal
 Jaya Mathur
 Vaishali Parmar
 Sumeet Arora
 Manohar Pandit
 Alankar Srivastava
 Ankit Sagar

Story # 20: Painting
 Krutika Desai Khan
 Adi Irani
 Jyotsna Karyekar
 Bhavna Singh
 Maruti Agarwal
 Mukesh Rawal
 Sharmili
 Ramesh Rai
 Saba Mirza
 Gopal Singh
 Jayant Rawal

Story # 21: Raaz
 Anant Jog
 Nattasha Singh
 Gargi Patel
 Rahul Verma Rajput
 Sonica Handa
 Sunita Rao
 Nikhil Diwan
 Ashok Sawan
 Vijaya Lakhani

Story # 22: Nishaan
 Sunila Karambelkar as Manthara (Episode 85 - Episode 88)
 Savita Bajaj as Anu (Episode 85)
 Rekha Rao as Rachna (Episode 85 - Episode 87)
 Sushmita Daan as Kanika (Episode 85 - Episode 88)
 Abhay Bhargava as Reshamnath (Episode 85 - Episode 88)
 Aliraza Namdar as Vijay (Episode 85)
 Yajuvendra Singh as Vicky (Episode 85 & Episode 86)
 Seema Pandey as Chitra (Episode 85 - Episode 88)
 Banwarilal Jhol as Servant (Episode 85 & Episode 87)

Story # 23: Makaya
 Avinash Wadhawan
 Anita Kanwal
 Mugdha Godbole
 Shailendra Srivastav
 Girish Jain
 Savi Sidhu
 Anup Patel
 Akbar Khan
 Deepa Chapekar
 Shammu Chibbar
 Dhananjay Singh

Story # 24: Takquilla Mansion
 Bhairavi Raichura as Neelima (Episode 93 - Episode 96)
 Sharad Kelkar as Neel (Episode 93 & Episode 96)
 Kunal Tavri as Jatin (Episode 93 - Episode 94 & Episode 96)
 Sanjay Sharma as Jindal (Episode 93 - Episode 96)
 Anup Puri as Karunesh (Episode 94)
 Dinesh Kaushik as Neelima's Father (Episode 94)
 Smita Oak as Spirit (Episode 94 & Episode 95)
 Zarina Wahab as Asha (Episode 95 & Episode 96)

Story # 25: Kathputli
 Vaishnavi Mahant
 Jiten Lalwani
 Shridhar Watsar
 Ravi Jhankal
 Ashiesh Roy
 Amit Kaushik
 Gopal Singh
 Dr. Anil Saxena
 Jamil
 Avinash Deshpande
 Jagdish Pandey
 Jaydeep Panjwani

Story # 26: Panja
 Mukesh Ahuja as Arun (Episode 101 - Episode 104)
 Murli Sharma as Ranvir (Episode 101 - Episode 104)
 Yashodhan Rana as Inspector (Episode 101 - Episode 104)
 Pankaj Vishnu as Inspector Vijay (Episode 101 - Episode 104)
 Reena Kapoor as Meena (Episode 102 - Episode 104)
 Bobby Khan as Vinod (Episode 102 - Episode 104)

Story # 27: Siski
 Vaquar Shaikh
 Nazneen Patel
 Rammohan Sharma
 Vicky Ahuja
 Priya Arya
 Vivek Mishra
 Tania Kumar
 Herman D'Souza
 Yogendra Kumeria
 Dr. Anil Saxena
 Manish Garg
 Rakesh Sharma

Story # 28: Faansi ke baad
 Firdaus Dadi
 Anupam Bhattacharya
 Dharam Taneja
 Raj Khanna
 Bhavna Singh
 Nikita Anand
 Rajan Kapoor
 Meenakshi Sethi
 Nilesh
 Bharmabhatt
 Ashok Punjabi

Story # 29: Video Game
 Gajendra Chauhan
 Rahul Lohani
 Malini Kapoor
 Jaya Binju
 Ramesh Goyal
 Banwanrilal Jhol
 Anup Shukla
 Ashok Awasthi
 Ajit Mehra
 Raja Kapse
 Kishan Mehta
 Manish Narayan
 Anurag Bali

Story # 30: Aag
  Rohit Bakshi
 Pallavi Dutt
 Vijay Bhatia
 Anupam Shyam
 Vijay Singh
 Jonny Sian
 Mayuresh Dandekar
 Seema Motwani
 Jonny Sian
 Mayuresh Dandekar

Story # 31: Jaanwar
 Dilip Thadeshwar
 Manasvi Vyas
 Shweta Rastogi
 Ali Khan
 Amit Pachori
 Shalini Arora
 Shakil Sayani
 Devendra Kumar

Story # 32: Obit Column
 Nasir Khan
 Keerti Gaekwad Kelkar as Kartika (Episode 125 - Episode 128)
 Jahangir Khan
 Kavit Dutt
 Richa Verma
 Cindrella D. Cruz
 Some Jain
 Manish Kulkarni

Story # 33: Tattoo
 Sanjay Sharma
 Aditya Rajput
 Aliza

Story # 34: 65 Crore ke liye
 Abir Goswami as Aryan (Episode 133 - Episode 136)
 Garima Kapoor
 Kashish Duggal
 Niraj Sood
 Vinod Singh
 Javed Abedi
 Bhavan Singh

Story # 35: Never Say Die
 Amita Chandekar
 Manoj Verma
 Minnie Tiwari
 Amit Kaushik

Story # 36: Kirdaar
 Nasir Khan
 Vishwajeet Pradhan
 Utkarsha Naik
 Poorva Parag
 Bakul Thakkar

Story # 37: Humsaya
 Shruti Ulfat
 Siddharth Dhawan as Rohan (Episode 145 - Episode 148)
 Juhee

Story # 38: Qaid
 Sucheta Khanna
 Aashish Kaul as Deven (Episode 149 - Episode 152)
 Sunila Karambelkar
 Sonal Bhogal

Story # 39: Cheating
 Faraaz Khan
 Madhavi Chopra
 Choyonica Ghosh
 Chirag Channa

Story # 40: Camera
 Sahil Chaddha
 Pragati Mehra
 Shruti Sharma

Story # 41: Shikar
 Ahmed Khan as Raja Saab (Episode 161 & Episode 162)
 Sanjay Sharma as J.J. (Episode 161 - Episode 164)
 Arup Pal as Shamsher Singh (Episode 161 - Episode 164)
 Rambahadur Renu as Sunka (Episode 161 - Episode 164)
 Rajesh Tandon as Vikram (Episode 161 - Episode 164)
 Vineet Kumar as Benua (Episode 161)
 Ritu Chaudhary as Inspector Kajal (Episode 162 - Episode 164)

Story # 42: Nishachar
 Amit Behl
 Chetanya Adib
 Sudeepa Singh
 Himmanshoo A. Malhotra

Story # 43: Nightmare
 Manasi Varma
 Gautam Chaturvedi
 Kajal Sharma
 Priya Valecha
 Shantanu

Story # 44: Back to the city
 Jiten Lalwani
 Amit Behl
 Vicky Ahuja
 Ashwin Kaushal

Story # 45: Shaadi
 Manav Kaul as Siddharth Pratap Singh (Episode 177 - Episode 180)
 Jahangir Khan as Rudra Pratap Singh (Episode 177 - Episode 180)
 Simple Kaul as Sonia (Episode 177 - Episode 180)
 Chitrapama Banerjee as Monica (Episode 178 - Episode 180)

Story # 46: Budhiya
 Pankaj Vishnu as Gagan (Episode 181 - Episode 184)
 Arya Rawal as Meena (Episode 181 - Episode 182 & Episode 184)
 Rahul Lohani as Rajan (Episode 181 - Episode 184)
 Samar Jai Singh as Prem (Episode 181 & Episode 184)
 Utkarsha Naik as Gagan's Mother (Episode 181 - Episode 184)
 Murli Sharma as Professor Narendra (Episode 183 & Episode 184)

Story # 47: Tingoo
 Sweta Keswani as Monica (Episode 185 - Episode 188)
 Manish Raisinghan
 Zahir Khan
 Kuldeep Dubey
 Suhasi Goradia Dhami

Story # 48: You are not alone
 Sherrin Varghese
 Neetha Shetty
 Aniket Jagtap
 Karuna Pandey

Story # 49: Man Eater Wall
 Karishma Tanna as Dhara (Episode 193 - Episode 196)
 Raj Khanna
 Tarun Mehta
 Manju Vyas
 Payal Shrivastava
 Kannan
 Mukesh Dasmana
 Arushi
 Dibyendu Bhattacharya
 Hitendra Chouhan
 Juhee
 Rommie Siddiquee

Story # 50: Sikka
 Abhimanyu Singh
 Jaya Mathur
 Deepak Dutta
 Vivek Mishra

Story # 51: Baawarchi
 Kabir Sadanand
 Zarina Wahab
 Anant Jog
 Siddharth Dhawan as Anil (Episode 201 - Episode 204)
 Chetanya Adib

Story # 52: Death Dealer
 Shilpa Shinde as Avantika (Episode 205 - Episode 208)
 Suhasi Goradia Dhami
 Govind Khatri
 Saurabh Dubey

Story # 53: Shareer
 Manish Khanna as Grover (Episode 209 - Episode 212)
 Rajiv Kumar as Roger (Episode 209 & Episode 210)
 Zeb Khan as Basky (Episode 209 & Episode 210)
 Yajuvendra Singh as Krish (Episode 209 - Episode 212)
 Faraaz Khan as Roy (Episode 209 - Episode 212) 
 Vicky Ahuja as Inspector (Episode 210 - Episode 212)
 Gopal Singh as Inspector (Episode 210 - Episode 212)
 Pradeep Kabra as Watchman (Episode 211)

Story # 54: Lift
 Bhairavi Raichura
 Rajesh Kumar
 Abhay Bhargava
 Mehul Kajaria

Story # 55: Fortune Cookies
 Simple Kaul as Mohini (Episode 217 - Episode 220)
 Sherrin Varghese as Parag (Episode 217 - Episode 220)

Story # 56: Coffee Shop
 Neetha Shetty
 Usha Bachani
 Rahul Lohani
 Soni Singh

Story # 57: Signal
 Puneet Vashist as Vaibhav (Episode 225 - Episode 228)
 Gulrez Khan
 Dibyendu Bhattacharya

Story # 58: Mariya
 Geetanjali Tikekar as Sanjana (Episode 229 - Episode 232)
 Rajeev Paul
 Dalljiet Kaur

Story # 59: Night Shift
 Mazher Sayed as Gyaneshwar (Episode 233 - Episode 236)
 Parul Yadav as Rashmi (Episode 233 - Episode 236)
 Yusuf Hussain as Premjeet (Episode 233 - Episode 236)
 Tasneem Sheikh as Monica (Episode 233 - Episode 236)
 Kuldeep Dubey as Shailen (Episode 234 & Episode 235)
 Adi Irani as Suraj (Episode 234 - Episode 236)

Story # 60: Black Way
 Ujjwal Chopra as Dipankar (Episode 237 - Episode 240)
 Dimple Inamdar as Snigdha (Episode 237 - Episode 240)
 Vaquar Shaikh as Kutty (Episode 237 - Episode 240)
 Yajuvendra Singh as Asit Khambata (Episode 237 - Episode 240)

Story # 61: The Rain of Death
 Kumar Hegde as Satish Kapoor (Episode 241, Episode 243 & Episode 244)
 Saurabh Dubey as Balwant (Episode 241 - Episode 244)
 Hrishikesh Pandey as Bobby Kapoor (Episode 241 - Episode 244)
 Rupali Ganguly as Sonali (Episode 241 - Episode 244)

Story # 62: Phone
 Nasirr Khan
 Rushali Arora
 Rinku Ghosh
 Sudarshana Bhatnagar

Story # 63: Electric Man
 Sonia Kapoor
 Gufi Paintal
 Nagesh Bhonsle
 Jahangir Khan

Story # 64: Vacuum Cleaner
 Rushad Rana
 Muskaan Mihani
 Vicky Ahuja

Story # 65: Kaanch
 Amita Chandekar
 Sanjeet Bedi as Rahul (Episode 257 - Episode 260)
 Mrinal Deshraj

Story # 66: Possession
 Sujata Choudhary
 Chitrapama Banerjee
 Mazher Sayed
 Dinesh Kaushik

Story # 67: Khopdi
 Firdaus Dadi
 Aashish Kaul as Vicky (Episode 265 - Episode 268)
 Tanushree Kaushal
 Khushi Dubey

Story # 68: Scarecrow
 Prithvi
 Kavita Rathod
 Faisal Raza Khan

References

Sahara One original programming
Indian horror fiction television series
2004 Indian television series debuts
2005 Indian television series endings